Apotoforma jamaicana is a species of moth of the family Tortricidae. It is found in Jamaica.

The wingspan is about 12 mm. The ground colour of the forewings is yellowish, suffused with brownish. The base of the costa and an ill-defined pattern are both brownish.

References

Moths described in 1964
Tortricini
Moths of the Caribbean